A Night with Janis Joplin is a Broadway musical that includes works of singer-songwriter Janis Joplin (1943–1970).  After 22 previews, it officially opened at the Lyceum Theatre on October 10, 2013, and closed in February, after 141 performances.

The musical is presented as Janis Joplin, backed by a band of hippies, performing a concert in 1970, shortly before she in fact died of drug overdose, at age 27.  Among other reviews, The New York Post characterized it as sanitizing Janis Joplin and serving as a vehicle for "power-piped" Mary Bridget Davies to mostly "stick to the music".

Its Broadway run was a $3.9 million production, and $650,000 was budgeted for an Off-Broadway run that was scheduled to open at the Gramercy Theatre.  The revival, however, was abruptly cancelled in April 2014, two days before it was to open. The Broadway version garnered a Tony Award Nomination for the lead actress Mary Bridget Davies.

The show performed on tour, including in Pasadena, California.

In August 2022, the show is adapted in Japan with singer Aina the End in the lead role.

Producers 
Producers of the original Broadway production include: Daniel Chilewich, Todd Gershwin, Michael Cohl, Jeffrey Jampol, TCG Entertainment LLC,  Red Tail Entertainment, Stephen Tenenbaum, Richard Winkler, Michael J. Moritz Jr., Corey Brunish, Brisa Trinchero, Ginger Productions, Bill Ham, Claudio Loureiro, Keith Mardak, Ragovoy Entertainment LLC, Bob & Laurie Wolf, Neil Kahanovitz, Mike Stoller, Corky Hale Stroller, Darren P. Deverna, Susan DuBow, Tanya Grubich, Jeremiah J. Harris, Jerry Rosenberg, AJ Michaels, Herb Spivak, Red Awning (Executive Producer), and Nicole Kastrinos (Executive Producer).

References

External links
Playbill index to reviews

Broadway musicals
2013 musicals
Jukebox musicals
Rock musicals